The Director of Military Intelligence and Security (C MUST) is a two-star role within the Swedish Armed Forces, responsible the Swedish Military Intelligence and Security Service. The Director of Military Intelligence and Security is part of the Defence Board (Försvarsmaktsledningen, FML), a group of the Supreme Commander's top commanders.

Tasks
The Director of Military Intelligence and Security duties are to—among other things—plan, lead, implement and follow up defense intelligence activities as well as military intelligence and security services. The military security service consists of security intelligence service, protective security service and signal protection service. The task includes leading and producing the National Intelligence Unit (Nationella underrättelseenheten, NUE) with the support of the Chief of Armed Forces Training & Procurement. The task includes supporting the Chief of Joint Operations with follow-up and analysis of external developments abroad. The Director of Military Intelligence and Security shall exercise the employer's duties and powers for the Swedish Military Intelligence and Security Service unit at the Swedish Armed Forces Headquarters, including defense attachés, and for the NUE with the support of the Chief of Armed Forces Training & Procurement. The task includes recruiting, training, equipping and leading and distributing the work, taking into account requirements for maintaining preparedness and carrying out operations.

 

The Director of Military Intelligence and Security leads and coordinates the Total Defense's signal protection service, including the work with secure cryptographic functions that are intended to protect confidential information and negotiate international signal protection agreements. The task includes supporting the Chief of Armed Forces Training and Procurement in the acquisition of secure cryptographic functions and with statements regarding information technology security. The Director of Military Intelligence and Security shall lead and coordinate the development of the intelligence and security service within the Swedish Armed Forces within the framework of the Armed Forces' operational plan and the Supreme Commander's operational assignment. The Director of Military Intelligence and Security shall support the Chief of Defence Staff and prepare the documents or perform the tasks that the Chief of Defence Staff or the head of the Headquarters decides on within the framework of the Headquarters' operations.

Furthermore, the Director of Military Intelligence and Security shall, with the support of the Chief of Joint Operations, obtain military unit evaluation as a basis for the Chief of Joint Operations' tactical and operational evaluation and support the Chief of Defence Staff's overall evaluation of the operational capability. The Director of Military Intelligence and Security shall support the Government Offices in matters relating to crypto operations and other signal protection activities.

Directors of Military Intelligence and Security

Deputy Directors of Military Intelligence & Security

Footnotes

References

 
Sweden
Military appointments of Sweden